The Rise of David Levinsky is a novel by Abraham Cahan.  It was published in 1917, and remains Cahan's best known work.

Plot summary

The book is told in the form of a fictional autobiography of David Levinsky, a Russian Jew who emigrates to America and rises from rags to riches.

Book I: Home and School
The main character, David Levinsky, is born in 1865 in Antomir, a city of 80,000 in the Kovno district of the Russian Empire (present-day Lithuania). His father dies when he is three, leaving him and his mother to fend for themselves. He grows up in abject poverty. Better off relatives send him to a private cheder for elementary instruction in Judaism and the Torah. From abuse by some rich kids, he becomes one of the tougher kids, but also excels academically.

Book II: Enter Satan
At age 13 David finishes his cheder education and begins Talmudic studies in a yeshivah. He meets and befriends Reb (Rabbi) Sender who has been supported by his wife while he spent sixteen hours daily studying the Talmud. Reb Sender is one of the most "nimble-minded" scholars in the town, and well liked. He also befriends Naphtali, another student two years ahead of him. David and Naphtali often study together at nightly vigils until morning worshippers come. David begins to feel an inner conflict between the religious instruction he receives and his growing interest in girls. He also thinks of his childhood dislike for Red Esther, the daughter of one of the other families in his basement home. Meanwhile, a Pole moves to Antomir and becomes a regular reader at the synagogue. The Pole has memorized 500 pages of the Talmud and recites by memory, provoking David's jealousy. He begins memorizing sections of the Talmud, but Reb Sender finds out and questions his motivation. This leads to a physical confrontation between David and the Pole.

Book III: I Lose my Mother
David is harassed in the Horse-market during Passover by a group of gentiles celebrating Easter; one gentile punches him. His mother sees his split lip and goes out to set straight the gentile who hit him, though advised not to. She is beaten to death and dies that night. 

After mourning he moves into the synagogue, as was often customary for poorer Talmudic students, and continues his studies. As was also customary for poor talmudic students, he "eats days" at the houses of benefactors, who invite Talmudic scholars for one meal per week. By and large, however, he goes hungry, until Shiphrah Minsker—a rich Jewish woman—hears of his plight. Finally well-fed, he reapplies himself to his studies. He has, however, lost interest in the Talmud. After the assassination of Czar Alexander II in 1881 and anti-Jewish riots, many Jews participated in the "great New Exodus"; David thoughts turn to seeking his fortune in America.

Book IV: Matilda
David's thoughts and attention have turned from his Talmudic studies towards America. He falls ill and is visited by Shiphrah every day in the hospital. After discharge, Shiphrah takes into her home while her husband is out of town on business long-term. He meets her daughter, Matilda, who has studied at a boarding school in Germany as well at secular Russian schools. Matilda taunts him in Yiddish while conversing with her friends in Russian, a language David does not understand. She urges him to get an education at a Russian university, but he insists on going to America to work so he can finance his studies. Matilda is convinced and offers to finance his journey. He realizes he is "deeply in love" with her. Matilda floats the idea of his studying at a Russian university. When word arrives that Matilda's father is returning from his business trip, David returns to the synagogue. She stops by to give him the 80 rubles the trip would cost and wishes him luck. On the eve of the one-year anniversary of his mother's death, he goes to the train station, and is seen off by his friends.

Book V: I Discover America
1885: David boards a steamer from Bremen to New York. He spends most of the journey praying, reading Psalm 104, and thinking about Matilda. He meets a fellow passenger, Gitelson, and wanders through the city. A man recognizes Gitelson to be a tailor and offers him work. David wanders about and is repeatedly called a greenhorn. At a synagogue he asks to sleep there for the night, but is told repeatedly that "America is not Russia." There he meets Mr. Even, a wealthy Jewish man, gives him money, clothing, dinner, and a haircut—including the removal of his sidelocks and arranges for lodging. He asks David not to neglect his religion and his Talmud. 

David spends the money on dry goods and begins to work as a peddler, managing to pay for rent and food, and makes no headway. He changes to selling linens, but his heart isn't really in it. He is terribly homesick. He spends many of his free evenings reading at the synagogue, but still gradually sheds his Russian-Jewish traits. His overall impression is that America is an impious land.

Book VI: A Greenhorn No Longer
David's reflects on other peddlers, and their coarse and exaggerated stories. One Max Margolis tells him he's a "good-looking chap", and recommends he learn to dance, adding that "every woman can be won." David tries to with his landlady who rejects him and says that he is no longer a greenhorn. He tries his former landlady, who kisses him once but rejects further advances. Work is only an obligation which he doesn't like. 

He enrolls in night school, learns English and tries to copy his teacher's mannerisms. His teacher gives David a copy of Dombey and Son by Charles Dickens. He neglects his work peddling and spends his time reading the book. David is fired but impressed by his own progress learning English. He spends a lot of time in a music shop where he borrows a lot of nickels, dimes, and quarters he is unable to repay.

Book VII: My Temple
After nearly two years in America, David has a chance encounter with Gitelson, the tailor from the ship. Gitelson is now successful and well-dressed, while David is poor and shabbily dressed. On Gitelson's urging, David begins a 6am-9pm apprenticeship. He begins earning and saving, attending local Jewish theater, and practicing his English. Working 16-hour days and saving aggressively, David hopes to save enough money to support himself so he can attend the City College of New York, to which he refers as his new "temple". During the garment industry's idle season he resume his studies. He shows little interest in socialists and the garment workers union.

Book VIII: The Destruction of My Temple
He "destroys" his temple by using the money he saved up to start his own business in the garment industry.  One order he filled went to a company that went bankrupt, so he is terribly in debt.  After a while, he gets a check from the company stating they had re-formed themselves, and he is sent his payment for the cloaks/coats or whatever.  His business slowly starts taking off and he trades his studies for his business.

Book IX: Dora
David meets Max's wife Dora, and becomes close with the entire family. He moves in with the family and begins to develop feelings towards Dora. David and the family move to a larger apartment up town, as was the trend to move up in society through the northern development of New York City. During their secretive affair David begins to become successful, having received an overdue paycheck and is finally able to afford materials for his shop. Orders begin to increase. David travels to acquire new business. He buys a bracelet for Dora, but she rejects him, partly from fear of being found out. Dora asks David to move out and he continues to focus on his business.

Book X: On the Road
He set up his business to run while he goes across the country trying to sell his garments, and he goes on and on about selling cloaks.

Book XI: Matrimony
He visits a marriage broker and is set up with some woman. His fortune continues to grow. He also has to deal with socialists because he doesn't pay his workers (mostly orthodox Jews) terribly well but they don't complain. He's set to marry this woman but then the next chapter happens.

Book XII: Miss Tevkin
Since the woman he is supposed to marry belongs to a religious family, on his trip to visit them, he realizes he can't arrive so they'll notice he traveled on the sabbath, so he stops at a resort for a night. There, he is smitten by this chick, miss Tevkin, who doesn't want him. He still falls in love with her because he's been doing that pretty regularly for the past 400 pages, that is, falling in love with women who don't reciprocate his love. He breaks it off with his fiancee.

Book XIII: At Her Father's House
He befriends their family and supports their socialist causes (she is a socialist) to try and win her favor. She marries some other guy.

Book XIV: Episodes of a Lonely Life
He reflects on how lonely he is and wishes he had been a socialist rather than a capitalist. He says he isn't happy and in spite of the women who want him, the only girl he can think about is Miss Tevkin.

Musical Adaptation
The novel was made into a musical by Isaiah Sheffer and Robert Paul and performed at the 92nd Street Y in 
New York City in the 1980s.

The musical was performed again by the New Vista Theatre Company in Boynton Beach, Florida, in March 2007.  New Vista was founded by |Avi Hoffman, who played the role of the younger David Levinsky in the original production.  He played the role of the older David Levinsky in the new production.

Off-Broadway
1987 saw the opening of what was headlined by UPI as "'The Rise of David Levinsky' is a triumph for off-Broadway" at John Houseman Theater, described as a "tiny theater on West 42nd Street."

Autobiography
Cahan's book is a Rags to riches story that begins with "the metamorphosis" of "arrived .. with four cents in my pocket" to "worth more than two million dollars." His self view is worded as "inner identity .. precisely the same as it was thirty or forty years ago ... devoid of significance."

Immigrant
The book has been described as "one of the earliest and one of the most notable pieces of Jewish immigrant fiction."

Alter Ego
To the book's author, Abraham Cahan, who was "the son of a rabbi ... trained as a teacher in the Jewish Folk Schools" described as "a literary realist devoted to presenting real life in fiction," the link from Cahan/Kohen to Levinsky/Levi/Levite is part of his Jewish educational
upbringing. An analysis of the book's name says that "Cahan drew the subtitle of his series from The Rise of Silas Lapham (1885) by William Dean Howells, the most influential advocate for realism." 

The full title of the McClure's magazine multi-part series upon which the book was built is The Autobiography of an American Jew: The Rise of David Levinsky. To perfect that "Levinsky is a fully realized character in the novel" the use of the name David, in place of Abraham, is needed, to make "relating his candid autobiography" represent "East European Jewish immigrants like himself." Levinsky is described as being "both narrator and participant."

Impact
Despite Cahan's impact on what Seth Lipsky calls "newspapering" and various on-stage adaptations and presentations, an 82 page 1983 university thesis concludes by calling The Rise of David Linsky a "somewhat neglected novel
novel," which another thesis labeled a "semi-autobiographical work" both by and about someone "torn apart between the American materialism and his spiritual roots."

The book was reprinted in 1993.

References

External links

 

1917 American novels
Jewish American novels